is a 2020 Japanese animated horror adventure film based on Humanoid Monster Bem franchise by ADK Emotions. The film is directed by Hiroshi Ikehata, written by Atsuhiro Tomioka, and produced by Production I.G. The film was released in Japan on October 2, 2020.

Following the events of the 2019 anime television series, Sonia Summers searches for Bem, Bela and Belo after they had disappeared.

Funimation licensed the film, and released on its website on October 29, 2020.

Synopsis
Two years after Bem, Bela and Belo defeated Vega, Sonia Summers is on a search for the three. On Doracho Chemicals, a city within an island, she stumbles upon a man named Belm that bares similar resemblance to Bem, with Bela and Belo being separated and doing their own things.

Voice cast

Production
In June 2020, it was announced that a film adaptation of Humanoid Monster Bem anime series was in the works, with the key staff and cast members from the 2019 television series returning to their respective positions: Hiroshi Ikehata is directing the film, with Atsuhiro Tomioka providing the screenplay, and Miho Matsumoto providing the character designs, while Production I.G is solely handling the animation production. That same month, it was announced that Kis-My-Ft2 boyband member Toshiya Miyata was cast as Burgess. Voice actors Nana Mizuki, Shizuka Itō, Koichi Yamadera and Wataru Takagi were cast as new characters the following month. J-Pop singer Rib provided the theme song for the film, titled "unforever".

Release
The film was released in theaters in Japan on October 2, 2020. The film was licensed by Funimation, and was streamed on its website in the United States, Canada, United Kingdom and Ireland on October 29, 2020.

Reception

Critical reception
Theron Martin of Anime News Network gave the film a solid B rating, and stated "While I might have liked to see the main villain and his motives developed a little more, the movie is generally paced well and fully completes its intended story."

Notes

References

External links
 

2020 anime films
2020s Japanese films
Japanese animated films
Japanese-language films
Production I.G
Horror anime and manga

ja:妖怪人間ベム#劇場版BEM 〜BECOME HUMAN〜 (2020年)